The 2017 Sugar Bowl is a bowl game that was played on January 2, 2017 at the Mercedes-Benz Superdome in New Orleans, Louisiana. This 83rd Sugar Bowl was played between a team from the Big 12 Conference and the Southeastern Conference.  It is one of the 2016–17 bowl games that concluded the 2016 FBS football season.  Sponsored by the Allstate insurance company, the game is officially known as the Allstate Sugar Bowl. The game was notable as Oklahoma's last under longtime head coach Bob Stoops prior to his retirement.

Teams
The two teams were selected by the College Football Playoff committee on December 4, 2016.  The highest-ranked team from the SEC and the Big 12 were to be selected.  However, the highest-ranked team from the SEC, Alabama, was selected in the semifinals of the playoff, so the second highest ranked SEC team went in their place. Auburn was the second highest ranked team at 14th in the playoff rankings, so they were selected for the Sugar Bowl.  Oklahoma was the Big 12 champion and the conference's  highest ranked at 7th, therefore sending the Sooners to the Sugar Bowl.

This was the second meeting between the two schools; the previous meeting was the 1972 Sugar Bowl, which saw the Sooners defeat the Tigers by a score of 40–22.

Auburn
After a disappointing 2015 season, Auburn coach Gus Malzahn was considered to be at risk of losing his job if a similar season followed.  The season started out poorly for the Tigers, as they started 1–2, with both losses coming to nationally-ranked teams.  However, in week 4, the Tigers played rival LSU.  LSU was #18 heading into the game, but it was Auburn that won 18–13.  That started a six-game win streak that put the Tigers into the national Top 10.  Towards the end of the season, injuries began to plague the Tigers, and they lost 2 of their final 3 games.  However, losses by Tennessee and Florida sent the Tigers to the Sugar Bowl.

Oklahoma
Oklahoma made the playoff in the 2015 season, and many experts expected them to compete for another playoff berth.  However, much like Auburn, the Sooners started 1–2, with both losses coming against nationally-ranked opponents.  That start ended any hope of going back to the playoff.  In the annual rivalry game against Texas, the Sooners won a close and hard-fought victory over the Longhorns, which started a turnaround and a nine-game win streak for the Sooners.  Included in that win streak was a win against Oklahoma State which gave the Sooners the Big 12 championship and the Sugar Bowl berth.

Game summary

Statistics

References

External links
 Game statistics at statbroadcast.com

2016–17 NCAA football bowl games
2017
2017 Sugar Bowl
2017 Sugar Bowl
January 2017 sports events in the United States
2017 in sports in Louisiana
21st century in New Orleans